Bảo Lạc is a township of Bảo Lạc District, Cao Bằng Province, Vietnam.

References

Populated places in Cao Bằng province
District capitals in Vietnam
Townships in Vietnam